The year 2008 is the 7th year in the history of the Maximum Fighting Championship, a mixed martial arts promotion based in Canada. In 2008 Maximum Fighting Championship held 5 events beginning with, MFC 15: Rags to Riches.

Title fights

Events list

MFC 15: Rags to Riches

MFC 15: Rags to Riches was an event held on February 22, 2008 at the River Cree Resort and Casino in Edmonton, Alberta.

Results

MFC 16: Anger Management

MFC 16: Anger Management was an event held on May 9, 2008 at the River Cree Resort and Casino in Edmonton, Alberta.

Results

MFC 17: Hostile Takeover

MFC 17: Hostile Takeover was an event held on July 25, 2008 at the River Cree Resort and Casino in Edmonton, Alberta.

Results

MFC 18: Famous

MFC 18: Famous was an event held on September 26, 2008 at the River Cree Resort and Casino in Edmonton, Alberta.

Results

MFC 19: Long Time Coming

MFC 19: Long Time Coming was an event held on December 5, 2008 at the River Cree Resort and Casino in Edmonton, Alberta.

Results

See also 
 Maximum Fighting Championship
 List of Maximum Fighting Championship events

References

Maximum Fighting Championship events
2008 in mixed martial arts
Events in Edmonton